Events from the year 1809 in Germany.

Incumbents

Kingdoms 
 Kingdom of Prussia
 Monarch – Frederick William III of Prussia (16 November 1797 – 7 June 1840)
 Kingdom of Bavaria
 Maximilian I (1 January 1806 – 13 October 1825)
 Kingdom of Saxony
 Frederick Augustus I (20 December 1806 – 5 May 1827)
 Kingdom of Württemberg
 Frederick I (22 December 1797 – 30 October 1816)

Grand Duchies 
 Grand Duke of Baden
 Charles Frederick (25 July 1806 – 10 June 1811)
 Grand Duke of Hesse
 Louis I (14 August 1806 – 6 April 1830)
 Grand Duke of Mecklenburg-Schwerin
 Frederick Francis I– (24 April 1785 – 1 February 1837)
 Grand Duke of Mecklenburg-Strelitz
 Charles II (2 June 1794 – 6 November 1816)
 Grand Duke of Oldenburg
 Wilhelm (6 July 1785 –2 July 1823 ) Due to mental illness, Wilhelm was duke in name only, with his cousin Peter, Prince-Bishop of Lübeck, acting as regent throughout his entire reign.
 Peter I (2 July 1823 - 21 May 1829)
 Grand Duke of Saxe-Weimar
 Karl August  (1758–1809) Raised to grand duchy in 1809

Principalities 
 Schaumburg-Lippe
 George William (13 February 1787 - 1860)
 Schwarzburg-Rudolstadt
 Friedrich Günther (28 April 1807 - 28 June 1867)
 Schwarzburg-Sondershausen
 Günther Friedrich Karl I (14 October 1794 - 19 August 1835)
 Principality of Lippe
 Leopold II (5 November 1802 - 1 January 1851)
 Principality of Reuss-Greiz
 Heinrich XIII (28 June 1800-29 January 1817)
 Waldeck and Pyrmont
 Friedrich Karl August  (29 August 1763 – 24 September 1812)

Duchies 
 Duke of Anhalt-Dessau
 Leopold III (16 December 1751 – 9 August 1817)
 Duke of Brunswick
 Frederick William (16 October 1806 – 16 June 1815)
 Duke of Saxe-Altenburg
 Duke of Saxe-Hildburghausen (1780–1826)  - Frederick
 Duke of Saxe-Coburg and Gotha
 Ernest I (9 December 1806 – 12 November 1826)
 Duke of Saxe-Meiningen
 Bernhard II (24 December 1803–20 September 1866)
 Duke of Schleswig-Holstein-Sonderburg-Beck
 Frederick Charles Louis (24 February 1775 – 25 March 1816)

Events 

 9 April – Tiroleans rise, under the command of Andreas Hofer, against French and Bavarian occupation.
 14 April – Battle of Abensberg, Bavaria: Napoleon defeats Austria.
 19 April – War of the Fifth Coalition –
 Battle of Raszyn: The armies of the Austrian Empire are defeated by the Duchy of Warsaw.
 Battle of Teugen-Hausen: The armies of the Austrian Empire are defeated by the French and their Bavarian allies.
 21 April – Battle of Landshut 
 21/22 April – Battle of Eckmühl
 23 April – Battle of Ratisbon
 24 April – Battle of Neumarkt-Sankt Veit
 8 July – Battle of Gefrees
 29/30 July – Battle of Halberstadt
 1 August – Battle of Ölper 
 Black Brunswickers established
 Corps Hannovera Göttingen established 
 Saxe-Weimar-Eisenach formed from a merger and raised to a grand duchy

Births 

 3 February – Felix Mendelssohn, German composer (d. 1847)
 24 February – Edwin Freiherr von Manteuffel, Prussian field marshal (d. 1885)
 21 February – Carl Ernst Bock, German physician and anatomist  (d. 1874).
 15 April – Hermann Grassmann, Prussian mathematician (d. 1877)
 5 May – Frederick Langenheim, German American pioneer of panoramic photography (died 1879
 23 May – Hugo von Kirchbach, Prussian general (d. 1887)
 13 June – Heinrich Hoffmann, German author and children's poet (d. 1894)
 20 June – Isaak August Dorner, German theologian (d. 1884)
 16 July – Konstantin Bernhard von Voigts-Rhetz, Prussian general (d. 1877)
 8 August – Heinrich Abeken, German theologian (d. 1872)
 12 September – Julius von Bose, Prussian general (d. 1894)
 10 November – David Einhorn (rabbi), German-American abolitionist (d. 12879)
 20 November – Gustav Koerner, German-born revolutionary, journalist, lawyer, politician, a statesman of Illinois and Germany, Colonel of the U.S. Army (d. 1896)
 30 December – Wilhelm von Tümpling, Prussian general (d. 1884)

Deaths 

 6 January – Johann Augustus Eberhard, German theologian, philosopher (b. 1739)
 18 March – Karoline Kaulla, German banker (b. 1739)
 26 April – Bernhard Schott, German music publisher (b. 1748)
 1 September – Johann Friedrich August Göttling, German chemist (b. 1753)
 7 September – Caroline Schelling, German scholar (b. 1763)
 28 November – Jakob Heinrich Laspeyres, German lepidopterist (b. 1769)

References 

Years of the 19th century in Germany

 
Germany
Germany